Percival Andrew Knowles (born 8 November 1930) is a Bahamian former sailor who competed in the 1960 Summer Olympics, in the 1964 Summer Olympics, in the 1968 Summer Olympics, and in the 1972 Summer Olympics. As of 2010, Knowles was still active in competitive sport, taking part in Masters swimming tournaments for the 80–85 age group.

References

1930 births
Living people
Bahamian male sailors (sport)
Olympic sailors of the Bahamas
Sailors at the 1960 Summer Olympics – Dragon
Sailors at the 1964 Summer Olympics – 5.5 Metre
Sailors at the 1968 Summer Olympics – Star
Sailors at the 1972 Summer Olympics – Soling